Robin Overbeeke (born ) is a Dutch male volleyball player. He is part of the Netherlands men's national volleyball team. On club level he plays for Lindemans Aalst.

References

External links
 profile at FIVB.org

1989 births
Living people
Dutch men's volleyball players
People from Leidschendam
Sportspeople from South Holland
21st-century Dutch people